In Greek mythology, Celaeno (Kelaino, lit. 'the dark one', also Celeno or Kelaino, sometimes [misspelled] Calaeno) was one of the Pleiades.

Mythology 
Celaeno was the daughter of Atlas and Pleione or Aethra. She was said to bore to Poseidon numerous children which includes: Lycus and Nycteus; of King Eurypylus (or Eurytus) of Cyrene, and Lycaon.

Modern references 
The following modern uses derive from the Ancient Greek mythical name:

 Celaeno, a star in the Pleiades open cluster of stars.
 USS Celeno (AK-76), a United States Navy Crater class cargo ship
 Ship Celaeno  builder  A. HALL & Co Aberdeen.  Rig: SHIP. Construction: Wood. Yard Number: 233. Completed in June 1863. Weighed 702 tons and measured 173.0 feet x 30.2 feet x 18.7 feet.  The Celaeno made eleven trips to New Zealand.

In popular culture 

 The star Celaeno features as a location in the Cthulhu Mythos stories of August Derleth. See Cthulhu Mythos celestial bodies and Extraterrestrial places in the Cthulhu Mythos
 Celaeno is the name of the chief Goddess in the Celaeno Series by Jane Fletcher.
 Celaeno (CeCe) is the main character of book 4 (The Pearl Sister) in the Seven Sisters series by Lucinda Riley

Notes

References 
 Apollodorus, The Library with an English Translation by Sir James George Frazer, F.B.A., F.R.S. in 2 Volumes, Cambridge, MA, Harvard University Press; London, William Heinemann Ltd. 1921. Online version at the Perseus Digital Library. Greek text available from the same website.

Pleiades (Greek mythology)
Arcadian characters in Greek mythology
Arcadian mythology
Boeotian mythology